Ilya Fedarenka (born 3 August 1998) is a Belarusian canoeist. He competed in the men's K-4 500 metres event at the 2020 Summer Olympics.

References

External links
 

1998 births
Living people
Belarusian male canoeists
Olympic canoeists of Belarus
Canoeists at the 2020 Summer Olympics
Place of birth missing (living people)